Steve Kokoska is an Australian former soccer player who played as a defender.

Career
Kokoska played for Sunshine City and Essendon Croatia in the Victoria State League.

Kokoska made his only appearance for Australia as a late substitute in a match against Greece in 1978.

References

Living people
People from Cunnamulla
Australian soccer players
Association football defenders
Australia international soccer players
Melbourne Knights FC players
Year of birth missing (living people)